Kiddush Levanah is a Jewish ritual, performed outside at night, in which a series of prayers are recited to bless the new moon.

History
The source of the Kiddush Levana is in the Babylonian Talmud:
 Rabbi Yochanan taught that one who blesses the new moon, in its proper time, is regarded like one who greets the Shechinah (Divine Presence).

The prayer, by its nature, is typically said outside at nighttime. Many synagogues post the text of the prayer in large type on an outside wall, for greater visibility. As such, the term "kiddush levana letters" has developed to refer to any text written in unusually large letters.

Timing
The Kiddush levana ceremony is performed on the first sighting of the new moon - performance at this time is deemed בזמנה - in its proper time, with some opining that only then is the blessing said while standing. Among the Mekubalim, Rabbi Chayim Vital likewise adopted the view of the ceremony being done on the first night of the new moon. However, the popular custom is to wait three complete days after the occurrence of the molad, or appearance of the new moon, with some waiting even seven days. The latest time for Kiddush Levanah is mid-month, i.e., fourteen days, eighteen hours and twenty-two minutes (some authorities extend this limit to fifteen full days) after the molad.

Ritual

It is customary to say Kiddush Levanah at the conclusion of Shabbat. The moon must be visible and not totally covered by clouds and the ceremony is normally performed outside. While it is customary to say the prayer with the large crowd after the Saturday evening services, or at least with a minyan, it can be also said without a minyan and in the middle of the week. In places where cloudy or rainy weather is very common, many people will recite the blessing as soon as they see the moon for the first time after the "three days".
In the month of Tishrei, it is usually delayed until after the conclusion of Yom Kippur; others have a custom to say it specifically before Yom Kippur. In the month of Av, it is traditionally postponed to following the fast of Tisha B'Av, as the beginning of the month is a time of mourning and the prayer should be said in a spirit of joy. If a holiday falls on Sunday, Kiddush Levanah is delayed until after that day.

It is customary to say additional passages that were added to this blessing in the 16th century by Rabbi Yitzhak Luria. These are Kabbalistic verses and it is difficult to understand their deeper meaning.

See also
Lunar phase
Jewish holidays
Jewish prayer service

References

External links
Text of Kiddush Levanah

Hebrew calendar
Jewish blessings
Hebrew words and phrases in Jewish prayers and blessings
Hebrew words and phrases in Jewish law